Düsseldorf-Eller Mitte station is located in the district of Eller in the German city of Düsseldorf in the German state of North Rhine-Westphalia. It is on the Düsseldorf–Solingen line and is classified by Deutsche Bahn as a category 5 station. It is served by Rhine-Ruhr S-Bahn line S 1 every 20 minutes, Stadbahn line U 75, operating every 10 minutes, tram line 705, operating every 10 minutes and two bus routes: 723 (every 30 minutes) and 724 (every 20 minutes), operated by Rheinbahn.

Since December of 2022, the Station is also served hourly by regional service RE 47 between Düsseldorf Hauptbahnhof and Remscheid-Lennep, operated by Regiobahn.

References

Footnotes

Sources

Düsseldorf VRR stations
Rhine-Ruhr S-Bahn stations
S1 (Rhine-Ruhr S-Bahn)
Railway stations in Düsseldorf
Railway stations in Germany opened in 1980